This is the list of plays of various Assamese mobile theatre groups, popularly known as Bhraymaman theatres,  for the season 2011–2012. The unique culture of Assam, the mobile theatres providing entertainment in both urban and rural areas of the state and has a record turnover of Rs 10 cr annually, beating the common notion of theatre artists not being paid well.

Season 2019-20 Kohinoor Theatre.
Entry for first time in theatre industry by Kohinoor Theatre. A talented Assamese film and theatre Actress Sharmistha Chakraborty,who played the role "Droupadi" from drama 'Droupadir Vastraharan'. She is known Droupadi of Kohinoor. Her popularity is an inspiration theatre industry. From then, she is continue in Assamese mobile theatre industry.

List of Plays

References

External links
NSD takes 'Mobile theatre of Assam' as its case study 
Bhraymaman theatre --Assamese mobile theatre industry

Kohinoor Theatre (2019–20)
Droupadir Vastraharan -Champak Sarah
Boroxa Jetiya Naame - Rajdweep
Mor Tejot tumar naam - Avijeet bhattacharya
Starring - Sharmistha Chakraborty, Arup baishya, Debojeet mazumdar

Assamese Mobile plays 2011
Culture of Assam
Assam-related lists